Skabelinsky is a rural locality (a khutor) in Mikhaylovskoye Rural Settlement, Uryupinsky District, Volgograd Oblast, Russia. The population was 100 as of 2010.

Geography 
Skabelinsky is located in steppe, 22 km north of Uryupinsk (the district's administrative centre) by road. Santyrsky is the nearest rural locality.

References 

Rural localities in Uryupinsky District